Víctor Zi-hsuan Chou Hsieh (born 5 February 1992), commonly known as Víctor Chou, is a footballer who plays as a central midfielder. In his youth career, he has played for youth teams of several reputable clubs such as Atlético Madrid and Real Valladolid. In January 2012, he left U.D. Salamanca and went to Asia for new challenges. Born in Spain, he made ten appearances for the Chinese Taipei national team.

Early life
Chou's parents, Pepe Chou Huo-lien and Hsieh Chi, are both from Taiwan. After graduating from the National Taiwan Institute of Arts, they emigrated to Spain to study fine arts there. As his father is passionate about football, he and his Spanish family (babysitters) instilled in Chou the concepts of the sport.

Club career

Early career
When he was still a child, his babysitter and her husband found Chou's football talents and suggested Pepe to let him have formal training.
Chou then joined Asociación Deportiva Juvenil, which is a futsal team in Tres Cantos. After three impressed matches, he joined the local amateur team Balompié Tres Cantos.

Atlético Madrid
In 2002, Chou joined Atlético Madrid's youth team, despite the fact that his parents were loyal fans of rival Real Madrid. In 2005, he was offered a contract by the youth team of Real Valladolid and decided to move there.

Valladolid
Chou's stay at the Pucela club was long and successful. He played many games as a youth player here.

Salamanca
In 2009, Chou transferred to UD Salamanca's youth team (Division Juvenil de Honor). In 2010, sources have said that Chou has been called up many times by the 1st team of UD Salamanca to participate in training and eventually play official matches in 2011 or 2012.

Salmantino
He was playing in third division. Afterwards, Chou was on trial at Shanghai Shenhua where he got his 5th metatarsal injury twice.

He went back to Spain to have a surgery by Real Valladolid doctor Oscar de la Hoya.

South China
On 16 March 2013, Victor was offered a trial with Hong Kong First Division club South China  On 29 March 2013, Steven Lo, chairman of South China, confirmed the signing of Victor Chou for the rest of the season.

Shenzhen
On July, Victor signed a contract for Shenzhen F.C., managed by Phillipe Troussier.

International career
Víctor Chou was born in Spain, and both of his parents are Taiwanese, he is available for representing both Spain and Chinese Taipei. 
As his performance was well in Valladolid, the CTFA has been attracted and called him up to the national team in June 2009.
In July 2010, the president of CTFA, Lu Kun-Shan, met with Chou and invited him to represent Chinese Taipei U23 for the 2012 London Olympics Qualifying.
On 9 March 2011, he played for Chinese Taipei U23 in the starting 11 and played for the whole match, but Chinese Taipei lost the match by 0-2.
On 29 February 2012, he made his debut game for Chinese Taipei Senior team, by substitution of his teammate Chen Yi-wei in 72 mins, in the friendly match against Hong Kong.

Personal life
At a young age he was a part-time model, which serves as Spain's largest department store El Corte Ingles, and interpretation for brands such as ZARA, Gstar.

Career statistics

Club

References

External links
 http://www.ctfacompetition.com.tw/teams/player/540 (in Chinese)
 http://www.udsbase.com/noticia.php?id=765 (in Spanish)
 http://www.facebook.com/vchou1992

1992 births
Living people
Footballers from Madrid
People with acquired Taiwanese citizenship
Taiwanese footballers
Chinese Taipei international footballers
Association football defenders
Spanish footballers
Spanish people of Taiwanese descent
Sportspeople of Chinese descent
South China AA players
Hong Kong First Division League players
Expatriate footballers in Hong Kong